Kottayam Chellappan (10 November 1923 – 26 December 1971) was an Indian actor in Malayalam movies. He was also a renowned stage actor and film actor who was very active in Malayalam films during the 1960s and '70s. He died on 26 December 1971.

Personal life
He is born as the third son among six children to Poovelil Sanku and Kunji Pennu on 10 November 1923 at Karapuzha, Kottayam. His brothers are the late Raghavan, Karunakaran, Sukumaran and his sisters are the late Sumathikutty and Padmavathi. He studied at MD High school, Kottayam. He studied till Intermediate. He started his career as a stage artist and acted in dramas and stage shows across Kerala. He also tried producing films, thereafter he settled as a film actor. Thikkurissy Sukumaran Nair advised him to use his name titled with Kottayam. He died on 26 December 1971 due heart attack. He was 48. He is survived by wife Nalini, four sons and three daughters. They are: Sri Jyothi, Late Shyam (Thampan), Kishore, Sreekala, Sheela (Moli), Maya and Charlie.

Partial filmography

Actor

 Minnalppadayaali (1959)
 Unniyaarcha (1961)
 Mudiyanaaya Puthran (1961)
 Kandambecha Kottu (1961)
 Bhaarya (1962)
 Puthiya Aakaasham Puthiya Bhoomi (1962)
 Paalaattu Koman (Konkiyamma) (1962)
 Kadalamma (1963)
 Ammaye Kaanaan (1963)
 Doctor (1963)
 Rebecca (1963)
 Pazhassiraaja (1964)
 Anna (Old) (1964)
 Thacholi Othenan (1964) as Chindan Nambiar
 Chettathi (1965) as Viswanathan
 Jeevithayaathra (1965)
 Odayil Ninnu (1965)
 Kadathukaaran (1965)
 Sarpakadu (1965)
 Kuppivala (1965)
 Arakkillam (1967)
 Ramanan (1967)
 Chithramela (1967)
 Sheelaavathi (1967)
 Khadeeja (1967)
 Thalirukal (1967)
 Pengal (1968)
 Vidyaarthi (1968)
 Danger Biscuit (1969)
 Kuruthikkalam (1969)
 Kannoor Deluxe (1969)
 Mooladhanam (1969)
 Nilakkatha Chalanangal (1970)
 Thaara (1970)
 Ningalenne Communistakki (1970) as Keshavan Nair
 Pearl View (1970)
 Othenante Makan (1970) as Thekkumpattu Karanavar
 Abhayam (1970)
 Cross Belt (1970)
 Dathuputhran (1970)
 Agnimrigam (1971)
 Panchavan Kaadu (1971) as Arumukham Pilla
 Lora Nee Evide (1971)

Story
 Khadeeja (1967)

References

External links

Kottayam Chellappan at MSI

Male actors from Kerala
Male actors in Malayalam cinema
Indian male film actors
20th-century Indian male actors
1923 births
1971 deaths